The International Society for Pediatric and Adolescent Diabetes is a professional organization located in Berlin, Germany, whose aims are to promote clinical and basic science, research, education and advocacy in childhood and adolescent diabetes. ISPAD publishes the journal Pediatric Diabetes. The organization was established in 1974.

About ISPAD
The International Society for Pediatric and Adolescent Diabetes (ISPAD) is a professional organization that brings together doctors, nurses, dieticians, psychologists, scientists and other professionals to improve the treatment of children and families afflicted by diabetes throughout the world. ISPAD seeks to improve the understanding of the etiology and epidemiology of diabetes. ISPAD educates physicians and other health care professionals to better understand and care for children and adolescents with diabetes. Furthermore, the Society has developed guidelines for appropriate diabetes care and assists in the implementation of new protocols for therapy.

Activities

Annual conference
The 40th Annual Conference of the International Society for Pediatric and Adolescent Diabetes, ISPAD 2014, will take place September 3–6, 2014, in Toronto, Canada. In the last four years the ISPAD Annual Conference has been held in Gothenburg (2013), Istanbul (2012), Miami (2011), and Buenos Aires (2010).

Past conferences

Travel grants
ISPAD also supports attendance at the annual conferences through the awarding of travel grants. Grants are awarded either to individuals based on the quality or to individuals from non-high-income countries as ‘Developing World Initiative Travel Grants’.

Post-graduate courses
ISPAD also supports post-graduate courses and workshops organized by members worldwide on the basis that these members organize the courses and raise most of the funding. Recent venues have included Jamaica, Romania, Jordan and Peru.

Science schools
The ISPAD Science and Research School for Physicians annual science school brings together 20 to 25 young researchers from across the world to take part in a learning program and engage in discussion with leading experts in the field. Courses have been held in Sydney, Cambridge (UK), and Kyoto.

ISPAD Science School for Healthcare Professionals is held each year just prior to the annual conference and is aimed at helping health professionals other than doctors to develop a scientific and evidence-based approach to their work with children and young people with diabetes.

Prizes
The society also has a well-established set of yearly prizes.
 The ISPAD Prize for Achievement is the society's highest honour. It is awarded for outstanding contributions in the areas of science, education and advocacy.
 The ISPAD Lestradet Prize for Education and Advocacy will be given to honour any ISPAD Member who has made an outstanding contribution within education and advocacy.
 Any ISPAD member (aged 40 or less) can apply for the ISPAD Young Investigator Award. The application must include a paper published in a peer-reviewed journal within two years prior to the application, and a CV including all publications.
 The ISPAD Prize for Innovation in Pediatric Diabetes Care is for any professional, group or individual who has made a significant innovation in pediatric diabetes care. This prize puts the focus on diabetes in childhood by recognizing innovations to improve health and quality of care for children and young people. Only non-commercial innovations will be considered for this prize.

Fellowships
ISPAD awards two fellowships:
 The Visiting Research Fellowship for ISPAD members below age 40 is designed to cover expenses for a six-month (or longer) visit in an ISPAD members' centre and can be applied for by ISPAD members who wish to study or carry out diabetes-related research at a recognized centre of excellence.
 The Alan Drash Clinical Fellowship is a six-week clinical fellowship offered for ISPAD members below 45 years of age so that they can study an aspect of diabetes important to them. Applicants are required to demonstrate suitability and to have a letter of support from the institution they intend to visit. A report must be submitted to the ISPAD Steering Committee within one year after the fellowship.

Journal
ISPAD publishes Clinical Practice Consensus Guidelines for the management of diabetes in children and adolescents. These are published in Pediatric Diabetes, ISPAD's official journal.

Other activities

ISPAD Consensus Guidelines
In 2009, the comprehensive "ISPAD Clinical Practice Consensus Guidelines" were published as a compendium in Pediatric Diabetes. These are evidence-based guidelines compiled under the editorship of Dr Peter Swift, former Secretary General of ISPAD with the co-authors Ragnar Hanas, Kim C. Donaghue and Georgeanna Klingensmith. The guidelines are used worldwide and referenced extensively.

References

External links
 Official website

Diabetes organizations
Medical and health organisations based in Berlin
International medical and health organizations